The 2008 Portsmouth City Council election took place on Thursday 1 May 2008 to elect members of Portsmouth City Council in Hampshire, England. One third of the council (14 seats) was up for election using the first-past-the-post voting system. The Conservatives won a majority of the seats being contested, while the council remained in no overall control.

After the election, the composition of the council was:

Conservatives: 19
Liberal Democrats: 19
Labour: 2
Independent: 2

Election result
NB: All comparisons are to the 2004 local elections, at which the same tranche of seats were contested.

Ward results
NB: All comparisons are to the 2004 local elections, at which the same tranche of seats were contested.

References

Portsmouth City Council - 2008 local election results

2008
2008 English local elections
2000s in Hampshire